The Morro Solar Group is a stratigraphic group of Mesozoic-aged sedimentary formations exposed near Lima, Peru. The groups formations more specifically of Berriasian and Valanginian age (Early Cretaceous) and overlies the Jurassic Puente Piedra Group and underlies the Cretaceous Pamplona Formation. The Morro Solar Group is intruded by sills of andesitic composition. Together with the Casma and Imperial Groups, the Morro Solar Group contains clastic volcanosedimentary material derivative of the Mesozoic Casma Volcanic Arc. The formations of the group hosts mostly local fossils which do not have counterparts for biochronological correlation in other regions.

Stratigraphy 

The formations of the Morro Solar Group are: La Herradura Formation, whose sediments reflect a marine near-shore deposition environment, the Valanginian Salto del Fraile Formation, and the Marcavilca Formation. The Salto del Fraile Formation is equivalent to the basal part of the Huancané Formation found further inland.

References

Geologic groups of South America
Geologic formations of Peru
Lower Cretaceous Series of South America
Cretaceous Peru
Berriasian Stage
Valanginian Stage
Hauterivian Stage
Geography of Lima Region